{{DISPLAYTITLE:C41H28O26}}
The molecular formula C41H28O26 (molar mass: 936.64 g/mol, exact mass: 936.086881 u) may refer to:

 Casuarictin
 Casuarinin

Molecular formulas